Parks and open spaces in Lancashire
Lancashire
King George V Playing Fields
King G